Johnny Boyle (1931 – 25 February 2017), also known as Seán O'Boyle, was an Irish Gaelic footballer who played for club sides Air Corps and Clanna Gael and at inter-county level with the Dublin senior football team.

Career

Boyle first came to prominence during his schooldays at De La Salle College in Kildare, during which time he served as captain of the Kildare minor team for three years. He subsequently declared for the Dublin senior team and, after making his debut in 1953 against Meath, ended the season with the first of three National League titles. Two years later hBoyle ad secured his first Leinster Championship medal, while he also lined out in the 1955 All-Ireland final defeat by Kerry. He won three provincial titles in total, and played at left wing-back in the 1958 All-Ireland final defeat of Derry.

Personal life and death

Born in Arbour Hill, Boyle's father was a member of the Irish Army who was later transferred to the Curragh. In 1949 Boyle himself enlisted in the Air Corps and spent the following six years at Baldonnell Aerodrome. After working in Dublin for a number of years he emigrated to New Zealand and secured a job with Safe Air as an aircraft technician. Boyle died in the Gold Coast, Australia on 25 February 2017.

Honours

Dublin
All-Ireland Senior Football Championship: 1958
Leinster Senior Football Championship: 1953, 1955, 1958
National Football League: 1952-53, 1954-55, 1957-58

References

1931 births
2017 deaths
Kildare inter-county Gaelic footballers
Dublin inter-county Gaelic footballers